Oltedal Church is a parish church of the Church of Norway in Gjesdal Municipality in Rogaland county, Norway. It is located in the village of Oltedal. It is one of the three churches for the Gjesdal parish which is part of the Jæren prosti (deanery) in the Diocese of Stavanger. The white, concrete church was built in a rectangular style in 2002 using designs by the architect Olav Urstad. The church was consecrated on 10 February 2002.

History
In 1926, a small chapel was built in Oltedal. It was designed by Gustav Helland and it was consecrated on 17 October 1926. It was a wooden long church with an asymmetrically placed tower in the northeast. In 1970, the chapel was renovated.

See also
List of churches in Rogaland

References

Gjesdal
Churches in Rogaland
21st-century Church of Norway church buildings
Churches completed in 2002
2002 establishments in Norway